Alexis Jesse M. Saelemaekers (born 27 June 1999) is a Belgian professional footballer who plays as a winger for  club AC Milan and the Belgium national team. Although he primarily plays in attack, he can also play as a full-back.

Club career

Anderlecht
In October 2017, Saelemaekers signed a contract at Anderlecht until 2019. On 16 February 2018, he made his official debut against Sint-Truiden. He was subbed on in the 77th minute. On 8 June 2018, he renewed his contract until 2022.

AC Milan
On 31 January 2020, AC Milan signed Saelemaekers on loan, with an option to buy. Milan reportedly agreed a €3.5 million fee plus €1 million in bonuses in case of a permanent signing. He made his debut as a substitute for Davide Calabria in a 1–1 draw against Verona on 2 February 2020.

On 1 July 2020, Saelemaekers signed a contract with Milan which would keep him at the club until 30 June 2024. On 18 July, he scored his first goal for the club in a 5–1 home win over Bologna in Serie A.

2020-21:

On first of October 2020, Saelemaekers scored his first goal of the season against Rio Ave in qualification match for Europa league.

His next goal came on 26 October against Roma in 3-3 draw, his third and last goal of the season was on 20 December against Sassuolo as Milan pulled an away 2-1 win.
In total this season, he scored 3 goals and assisted 5.

2021-22:

On 15 October 2021, Saelemaekers extended his contract until 30 June 2026, with a raise in salary.

On 4th of December, he scored his first goal of this season against Salernitana, a powerful left footed shot in eventual 2-0 win. His next goal came in Coppa Italia against Genoa on 13 January 2022, a goal in extra-time as Milan won 3-1.

International career
Saelemaekers debuted with the Belgium national team in a 1–1 friendly draw with Ivory Coast on 8 October 2020.

Career statistics

Club

International

Scores and results list Belgium's goal tally first. Score column indicates score after each Saelemaekers goal.

Honours
AC Milan
Serie A: 2021–22

References

External links

 Profile at the AC Milan website
 
 Alexis Saelemaekers at TBPlayers

1999 births
Living people
Association football midfielders
Belgian footballers
Belgium international footballers
Belgium under-21 international footballers
Belgium youth international footballers
R.S.C. Anderlecht players
A.C. Milan players
Belgian Pro League players
Serie A players
People from Sint-Agatha-Berchem